Coin weights are weights which were designed to weigh coins in order to assure their quality.

The usage of coin weights, especially glass ones, goes back to Ptolemaic and Byzantine times. Coin weights were also known in Ancient China.

In Islamic civilization, where they are called Sanadjāt, coin weights are said to have been introduced by a Jew named Sumair in 694. Up to that point coins were only compared to coins of good quality. Islamic coin weights were made of bronze, iron, and later glass (considered to be unalterable). They bear inscriptions related to Islamic rulers and moneyers and are therefore valuable epigraphical objects.

Coins weights were also known in the Carolingian Empire, where they were stamped with regular coin dyes to clarify their attribution. Islamic coin weights were introduced to Great Britain in the 9-10th century CE through the Vikings.

Notes

Numismatics